The 1902–03 Primera Fuerza season was the first season of the amateur era in Méxican Football. Statistics of Primera Fuerza in season 1902–03. The tournament started 9 October 1902 and ended 1 February 1903.

Overview
It was contested by 5 teams, and Orizaba won the championship. Teams played each other once and the winner was determined by the points accumulated at the end of the last game.

Matches 
On 20 September 1902 the calendar for the tournament was presented. The tournament was supposed to begin 19 October 1902 and end 28 December 1902 in order to not interfere with the tournament of cricket. The meeting took place in the offices of British Club. The games that were going to be played in Ciudad de México would be played in Campo del Reforma while Orizaba and Pachuca would play their respective games in their own cities.

League standings

Results

Top goalscorers
Players sorted first by goals scored, then by last name.

References
Mexico - List of final tables (RSSSF)

See also

1902-03
Mex
1902–03 in Mexican football